Youngstown was a station along the Erie Railroad and later the Erie-Lackawanna Railway, from 1922 to 1977 in Youngstown, Ohio. All railroad tracks behind the terminal have been removed, and the building is currently known as Erie Terminal Place, alternative student housing for students attending Youngstown State University.

Passenger train services
The station into the 1960s served several long distance Erie-Lackawanna trains (each, former Erie Railroad trains) on the road's Hoboken, New Jersey–Chicago, Illinois circuit: the Atlantic Express/Pacific Express, the Erie Limited, the Lake Cities.  The final run of the Lake Cities, the last of these trains after 1965, was in January 1970. 

The Erie-Lackawanna, and then, Conrail, continued commuter rail services between Cleveland Union Terminal and Youngstown. Conrail ended this service on January 14, 1977.

Gallery

References

Former Erie Railroad stations
Mahoning County, Ohio
Former railway stations in Ohio
Railway stations in the United States opened in 1922
Railway stations closed in 1977
National Register of Historic Places in Mahoning County, Ohio